49th Brigade of 49th Infantry Brigade may refer to:

 49th Indian Brigade of the British Indian Army in the First World War
 49th Indian Infantry Brigade of the British Indian Army in the Second World War
 49th Mixed Brigade, a unit of the Spanish Republican Army
 49th Brigade (United Kingdom), a World War I unit of the British Army
 49th Infantry Brigade (United Kingdom), a Cold War unit of the British Army
 49th Military Police Brigade (United States), a unit of the United States Army

See also
 49th Division (disambiguation)
 49th Regiment (disambiguation)
 49th Squadron (disambiguation)